The Clay County Courthouse in Fort Gaines, Georgia was built in about 1871.  It is a two-story brick building that "looks more like an antebellum plantation house than a courthouse."  It was listed on the National Register of Historic Places in 1980.

It is described as "Carpenter style with Classic details".  It is a two-story hipped-roof building.  It has a portico with square columns and a balcony on the second floor, and it has colossal pilasters on each end of its facade.

References

External links 

Courthouses on the National Register of Historic Places in Georgia (U.S. state)
Government buildings completed in 1871
National Register of Historic Places in Clay County, Georgia
County courthouses in Georgia (U.S. state)
1871 establishments in Georgia (U.S. state)